Anthony Richard Caceres (born 29 September 1992) is an Australian association football player who plays as a central midfielder for Sydney FC.

Career

Central Coast Mariners
Caceres made his A-League debut for the Central Coast Mariners in the F3 Derby against the Newcastle Jets, starting in a scoreless draw in January 2013. He scored his first goal for the club one year and two days later, again against the Jets, making a run from halfway and shooting from outside the area to open the scoring in a 3–0 win.

Manchester City
On 15 January 2016, Caceres was sold to Premier League club Manchester City on a long-term contract for fee in the region of AUS$300,000. He was immediately loaned out to their A-League partner, Melbourne City.
Caceres' move to Melbourne City sparked some controversy, given that transfer fees are not allowed to be paid directly between A-League clubs.

Loan to Melbourne City
Caceres had a troubled start to life at City, receiving 2 red cards in his first 4 games, the second coming in the 79th minute of the Melbourne Derby.

Caceres scored his first goal for City coming off the bench in a 3–1 win over Brisbane Roar, with his headed goal putting City temporarily on top of A-League table.

Caceres's loan to City was extended for successive years in both June 2016 and 2017.

Loan to Al-Wasl
Caceres left Melbourne and moved on loan to Al-Wasl in July 2017, including an option for the UAE Arabian Gulf League side to purchase Caceres outright from Manchester City.

Second loan to Melbourne City
On 25 June 2018, Caceres was loaned once more to Melbourne City for the 2018–19 A-League season. His loan was ended on 1 January 2019.

Sydney FC
On 1 January 2019, Caceres was loaned to Sydney FC. At the end of his contract Caceres returned to Manchester City and was then signed permanently by Sydney FC on a two-year deal.

Personal life
He is married to Melbourne City FC W-League forward Helen Petinos (married on 2 June 2018), whom he met at Westfields Sports High School.
Caceres is of Uruguayan descent and Nacional supporter as he shows in his Instagram.

They are the first husband and wife, to play at the same club in the A-League and the affiliated W-League (Australia).

Career statistics

Honours
Central Coast Mariners
A-League Championship: 2012–13

Melbourne City
FFA Cup: 2016

Sydney FC
A-League Championship: 2018–19, 2019–20
A-League Premiership: 2019–20

Individual
Mariners Medal: 2014–15
A-Leagues All Star: 2022

See also
List of Central Coast Mariners FC players

References

External links

1992 births
Living people
Australian soccer players
Association football midfielders
A-League Men players
Central Coast Mariners FC players
Marconi Stallions FC players
Manchester City F.C. players
Melbourne City FC players
Al-Wasl F.C. players
Sydney FC players
Australian people of Uruguayan descent
Sportspeople of Uruguayan descent
UAE Pro League players